Arthur James Evans (born March 27, 1942) is an American actor who has made multiple film and television program appearances over three decades.

Evans was born in Berkeley, California. His acting career, spanning almost 40 years, started with Frank Silvera's Theater of Being in Los Angeles.  He took a starring role in The Amen Corner which transferred to Broadway in 1965.  His first uncredited acting performance in film was Claudine in 1974. His first credited role was in Chico and the Man as Bubba in the episode "Too Many Crooks" which aired in 1976, and his talents for many instruments came in handy when playing Blind Lemon Jefferson in the movie Leadbelly (1976).

One of Evans's early roles was the first victim in the John Carpenter film Christine, based on the novel by Stephen King; Evans played a Detroit auto worker found dead on the assembly line after daring to flick cigar ash on Christine's upholstery. In 1984, Evans co-starred in the all-star African-American drama A Soldier's Story as the memorable brown-nosing character Wilkie. He is probably best known for his role as Leslie Barnes in the action  film Die Hard 2 (1990) in which he played an air traffic control tower employee at Dulles International Airport that helps LAPD detective John McClane, played by Bruce Willis, stop terrorists from crashing planes. His other film credits include Big Time (1977), Youngblood (1978), The Cracker Factory (1979), National Lampoon's Class Reunion (1982), Into the Night (1985), Fright Night (1985), Jo Jo Dancer, Your Life Is Calling (1986), Ruthless People (1986), Native Son (1986), White of the Eye (1987), School Daze (1988), The Mighty Quinn (1989), Downtown (1990), Trespass (1992), CB4 (1993), Bitter Harvest (1993), Tales from the Hood (1995) and Metro (1997). He has also made many appearances in a variety of television shows such as M*A*S*H, Hill Street Blues, Monk, The X-Files, and Family Matters on which he played a man claiming to be Santa Claus.

Evans also starred in the music video for Stevie Wonder's "Go Home".

In 2010, Art Evans was seen in Anderson's Cross playing the grandfather of the lead character Nick Anderson. In 2011, Art had a guest appearance on the sitcom Last Man Standing in the episode titled "Grandparents Day".

Selected filmography

Sisters (1972) as African Room Waiter (uncredited)
Claudine (1974) as Young Brother (uncredited)
Death Wish (1974) as Police at Precinct (uncredited)
Amazing Grace (1974) as Well-Wisher at Train Station (uncredited)
Leadbelly (1976) as Blind Lemon Jefferson
Fun with Dick and Jane (1977) as Man At Bar
Big Time (1977) as Buzz Murdock
Youngblood (1978) as Junkie
The In-Laws (1979) as Driver
The Main Event (1979) as Fighter
The Apple Dumpling Gang Rides Again (1979) as Baggage Master
First Family (1980) as Longo's Right Hand Man
Wrong Is Right (1982) as Warehouse Guard
National Lampoon's Class Reunion (1982) as Carl Clapton
Christine (1983) as Auto Assembly Worker (uncredited)
A Soldier's Story (1984) as Private Wilkie
Tuff Turf (1985) as Security Guard
Into the Night (1985) as Jimmy
Fright Night (1985) as Detective Lennox
Jo Jo Dancer, Your Life Is Calling (1986) as Arturo
Ruthless People (1986) as Lt. Bender
Native Son (1986) as Doc
White of the Eye (1987) as Detective Charles Mendoza
School Daze (1988) as Cedar Cloud
The Mighty Quinn (1989) as Jump Jones
Downtown (1990) as Henry Coleman
Die Hard 2 (1990) as Leslie Barnes
Mom (1991) as Lt. Hendrix
The Finishing Touch (1992) as Lieutenant Morman
Trespass (1992) as Bradlee
CB4 (1993) as Albert Sr.
Bitter Harvest (1993) as Earl Yates
Tales from the Hood (1995) as Eli
Bushwhacked (1995) as Marty (uncredited)
The Great White Hype (1996) as Minister
Metro (1997) as Lt. Sam Baffett
The Breaks (1999)
The Story of Us (1999) as George
The Cheapest Movie Ever Made (2000)
Deadly Rhapsody (2001) as James Tanner
Interstate 60: Episodes of The Road (2002) as Otis (a worker in a warehouse) 
Young Cesar (2007)
Everybody Hates Chris (2007, TV Series) as Luther
Shades of Ray (2008) as Tyler
Machete Joe (2010) as Sammy
House Under Siege (2010) as Jack Miller
Church (2010) as Pastor Jones
Anderson's Cross (2010) as Grandfather
iSteve (2013) as Ol' Mose
Gemini Rising (2013) as General Tabor
Orphaned (2018) as Councilman Haley

References

External links

 Art Evans TV Guide

1942 births
Living people
American male film actors
American male television actors
Male actors from Berkeley, California
African-American male actors
21st-century African-American people
20th-century African-American people